The 12th United States Congress was a meeting of the legislative branch of the United States federal government, consisting of the United States Senate and the United States House of Representatives. It met in Washington, D.C. from March 4, 1811, to March 4, 1813, during the third and fourth years of James Madison's presidency.  The apportionment of seats in the House of Representatives was based on the 1800 United States census. Both chambers had a Democratic-Republican majority.

Major events

November 6, 1811: Battle of Tippecanoe: William Henry Harrison defeated Tecumseh's forces
 December 16, 1811: New Madrid earthquake
 April 4, 1812: President Madison enacted a 90-day embargo on trade with the United Kingdom
April 20, 1812: Vice President George Clinton died
June 18, 1812: War of 1812: United States declared war on Great Britain
August 16, 1812: War of 1812: Detroit surrendered to the British.
October 13, 1812: War of 1812: the Battle of Queenston Heights
 November 5, 1812: Elections of 1812:
 1812 United States presidential election: Incumbent James Madison beat DeWitt Clinton.
 United States Senate elections, 1812 and 1813
 United States House of Representatives elections, 1812 and 1813

Major legislation

States admitted and territories organized 
April 30, 1812: Louisiana was admitted as a state into the Union. It was formerly known as the Territory of Orleans
June 4, 1812: Missouri Territory was organized. It was formerly known as Louisiana Territory

Party summary
The count below identifies party affiliations at the beginning of the first session of this congress. Changes resulting from subsequent replacements are shown below in the "Changes in membership" section.

Senate 
During this congress, two new Senate seats were added for the new state of Louisiana.

House of Representatives 
During this congress, one new House seat was added for the new state of Louisiana.

Leadership

Senate 
President: George Clinton (DR), until April 20, 1812; vacant thereafter.
President pro tempore: William H. Crawford (DR)

House of Representatives
Speaker: Henry Clay (DR)

Members
This list is arranged by chamber, then by state. Senators are listed by class, and representatives are listed by district.

Senate
Senators were elected by the state legislatures every two years, with one-third beginning new six-year terms with each Congress. Preceding the names in the list below are Senate class numbers, which indicate the cycle of their election. In this Congress, Class 1 meant their term began in the last Congress, requiring re-election in 1814; Class 2 meant their term began with this Congress, requiring re-election in 1816; and Class 3 meant their term ended with this Congress, requiring re-election in 1812

Skip to House of Representatives, below

Connecticut 
 1. Samuel W. Dana (F)
 3. Chauncey Goodrich (F)

Delaware 
 1. Outerbridge Horsey (F)
 2. James A. Bayard (F)

Georgia 
 2. William H. Crawford (DR)
 3. Charles Tait (DR)

Kentucky 
 2. George M. Bibb (DR)
 3. John Pope (DR)

Louisiana 
 2. Jean N. Destréhan (DR), September 3, 1812 – October 1, 1812
 Thomas Posey (DR), October 8, 1812 – February 4, 1813
 James Brown (DR), from February 5, 1813
 3. Allan B. Magruder (DR), from September 3, 1812

Maryland 
 1. Samuel Smith (DR)
 3. Philip Reed (DR)

Massachusetts 
 1. James Lloyd (F)
 2. Joseph Bradley Varnum (DR), from June 29, 1811

New Hampshire 
 2. Nicholas Gilman (DR)
 3. Charles Cutts (F)

New Jersey 
 1. John Lambert (DR)
 2. John Condit (DR)

New York 
 1. Obadiah German (DR)
 3. John Smith (DR)

North Carolina 
 2. James Turner (DR)
 3. Jesse Franklin (DR)

Ohio 
 1. Thomas Worthington (DR)
 3. Alexander Campbell (DR)

Pennsylvania 
 1. Michael Leib (DR)
 3. Andrew Gregg (DR)

Rhode Island 
 1. Christopher G. Champlin (F), until October 2, 1811
 William Hunter (F), from October 28, 1811
 2. Jeremiah B. Howell (DR)

South Carolina 
 2. John Taylor (DR)
 3. John Gaillard (DR)

Tennessee 
 1. Joseph Anderson (DR)
 2. Jenkin Whiteside (DR), until October 8, 1811
 George W. Campbell (DR), from October 8, 1811

Vermont 
 1. Jonathan Robinson (DR)
 3. Stephen R. Bradley (DR)

Virginia 
 1. Richard Brent (DR)
 2. William B. Giles (DR)

House of Representatives
The names of members of the House of Representatives are preceded by their district numbers.

Connecticut 
All representatives were elected statewide on a general ticket.
 . Epaphroditus Champion (F)
 . John Davenport (F)
 . Lyman Law (F)
 . Jonathan O. Moseley (F)
 . Timothy Pitkin (F)
 . Lewis B. Sturges (F)
 . Benjamin Tallmadge (F)

Delaware 
 . Henry M. Ridgely (F)

Georgia 
All representatives were elected statewide on a general ticket.
 . William W. Bibb (DR)
 . Howell Cobb (DR), until before October, 1812
 William Barnett (DR), from October 5, 1812
 . Bolling Hall (DR)
 . George M. Troup (DR)

Kentucky 
 . Anthony New (DR)
 . Samuel McKee (DR)
 . Stephen Ormsby (DR)
 . Richard M. Johnson (DR)
 . Henry Clay (DR)
 . Joseph Desha (DR)

Louisiana 
 . Thomas B. Robertson (DR), from December 23, 1812 (newly admitted state)

Maryland 
The 5th district was a plural district with two representatives.
 . Philip Stuart (F)
 . Joseph Kent (DR)
 . Philip B. Key (F)
 . Samuel Ringgold (DR)
 . Peter Little (DR)
 . Alexander McKim (DR)
 . John Montgomery (DR), until April 29, 1811
 Stevenson Archer (DR), from October 26, 1811
 . Robert Wright (DR)
 . Charles Goldsborough (F)

Massachusetts 
 . Josiah Quincy (F)
 . William Reed (F)
 . Leonard White (F)
 . Joseph Bradley Varnum (DR), until June 29, 1811
 William M. Richardson (DR), from November 4, 1811
 . William Ely (F)
 . Samuel Taggart (F)
 . Charles Turner Jr. (DR)
 . Isaiah L. Green (DR)
 . Laban Wheaton (F)
 . Elijah Brigham (F)
 . Abijah Bigelow (F)
 . Ezekiel Bacon (DR)
 . Ebenezer Seaver (DR)
 . Richard Cutts (DR)
 . William Widgery (DR)
 . Peleg Tallman (DR)
 . Barzillai Gannett (DR), until sometime in 1812 before April 6
 Francis Carr (DR), from April 6, 1812

New Hampshire 
All representatives were elected statewide on a general ticket.
 . Josiah Bartlett Jr. (DR)
 . Samuel Dinsmoor (DR)
 . Obed Hall (DR)
 . John A. Harper (DR)
 . George Sullivan (F)

New Jersey 
All representatives were elected statewide on a general ticket.
 . Adam Boyd (DR)
 . Lewis Condict (DR)
 . Jacob Hufty (DR)
 . George C. Maxwell (DR)
 . James Morgan (DR)
 . Thomas Newbold (DR)

New York 
There were two plural districts, the 2nd & 6th each had two representatives.
 . Ebenezer Sage (DR)
 . Samuel L. Mitchill (DR)
 . William Paulding Jr. (DR)
 . Pierre Van Cortlandt Jr. (DR)
 . James Emott (F)
 . Thomas B. Cooke (DR)
 . Asa Fitch (F)
 . Robert Le Roy Livingston (F), until May 6, 1812
 Thomas P. Grosvenor (F) from January 29, 1813
 . Harmanus Bleecker (F)
 . Benjamin Pond (DR)
 . Thomas Sammons (DR)
 . Silas Stow (DR)
 . Thomas R. Gold (F)
 . Arunah Metcalf (DR)
 . Uri Tracy (DR)
 . Daniel Avery (DR)
 . Peter B. Porter (DR)

North Carolina 
 . Lemuel Sawyer (DR)
 . Willis Alston (DR)
 . Thomas Blount (DR), until February 7, 1812
 William Kennedy (DR), from January 30, 1813
 . William Blackledge (DR)
 . William R. King (DR)
 . Nathaniel Macon (DR)
 . Archibald McBryde (F)
 . Richard Stanford (DR)
 . James Cochran (DR)
 . Joseph Pearson (F)
 . Israel Pickens (DR)
 . Meshack Franklin (DR)

Ohio 
 . Jeremiah Morrow (DR)

Pennsylvania 
There were four plural districts, the 1st, 2nd, & 3rd had three representatives each, the 4th had two representatives.
 . William Anderson (DR)
 . James Milnor (F)
 . Adam Seybert (DR)
 . Robert Brown (DR)
 . Jonathan Roberts (DR)
 . William Rodman (DR)
 . Roger Davis (DR)
 . John M. Hyneman (DR)
 . Joseph Lefever (DR)
 . David Bard (DR)
 . Robert Whitehill (DR)
 . George Smith (DR)
 . William Crawford (DR)
 . William Piper (DR)
 . William Findley (DR)
 . John Smilie (DR), until December 30, 1812, vacant thereafter
 . Aaron Lyle (DR)
 . Abner Lacock (DR)

Rhode Island 
Both representatives were elected statewide on a general ticket.
 . Richard Jackson Jr. (F)
 . Elisha R. Potter (F)

South Carolina 
 . Langdon Cheves (DR)
 . William Butler Sr. (DR)
 . David R. Williams (DR)
 . William Lowndes (DR)
 . Richard Winn (DR)
 . John C. Calhoun (DR)
 . Thomas Moore (DR)
 . Elias Earle (DR)

Tennessee 
 . John Rhea (DR)
 . John Sevier (DR)
 . Felix Grundy (DR)

Vermont 
 . Samuel Shaw (DR)
 . William Strong (DR)
 . James Fisk (DR)
 . Martin Chittenden (F)

Virginia 
 . Thomas Wilson (F)
 . John Baker (F)
 . John Smith (DR)
 . William McCoy (DR)
 . James Breckinridge (F)
 . Daniel Sheffey (F)
 . Joseph Lewis Jr. (F)
 . John P. Hungerford (DR), until November 29, 1811
 John Taliaferro (DR), from November 29, 1811
 . Aylett Hawes (DR)
 . John Dawson (DR)
 . John Roane (DR)
 . Burwell Bassett (DR)
 . William A. Burwell (DR)
 . Matthew Clay (DR)
 . John Randolph (DR)
 . James Pleasants (DR)
 . Thomas Gholson Jr. (DR)
 . Peterson Goodwyn (DR)
 . Edwin Gray (DR)
 . Thomas Newton Jr. (DR)
 . Hugh Nelson (DR)
 . John Clopton (DR)

Non-voting members 
 . Shadrack Bond, from December 3, 1812
 . Jonathan Jennings
 . George Poindexter
 . Edward Hempstead, from November 9, 1812
 , vacant until April 29, 1812

Changes in membership
The count below reflects changes from the beginning of the first session of this Congress.

Senate 
 Replacements: 1
 Democratic-Republicans: no net change
 Federalists: no net change
 Deaths: 0
 Resignations: 4
 Interim appointments: 1
 Seats of newly admitted states: 2
 Vacancies:1
Total seats with changes: 6

|-
| Massachusetts(2)
| Vacant
| Legislature elected late.Successor elected June 29, 1811.
|  | Joseph B. Varnum (DR)
| June 29, 1811

|-
| Rhode Island(1)
|  | Christopher G. Champlin (F)
| Resigned October 2, 1811Successor elected October 28, 1811.
|  | William Hunter (F)
| October 28, 1811

|-
| Tennessee(2)
|  | Jenkin Whiteside (DR)
| Resigned October 8, 1811.Successor elected October 8, 1811.
|  | George W. Campbell (DR)
| October 8, 1811

|-
| Louisiana(3)
| New seat
| Louisiana was admitted to the Union on April 30, 1812.Inaugural Senator elected September 3, 1812, for the term ending March 4, 1813.
|  | Allan B. Magruder (DR)
| September 3, 1812

|-
| rowspan=3 | Louisiana(2)
| New seat
| Louisiana was admitted to the Union on April 30, 1812.Inaugural Senator elected September 3, 1812, for the term ending March 4, 1817.
|  | Jean Noel Destréhan (DR)
| September 3, 1812

|-
|  | Jean N. Destréhan (DR)
| Resigned October 1, 1812, without having qualified.Successor appointed October 8, 1812, to continue the term ending March 4, 1817.
|  | Thomas Posey (DR)
| October 8, 1812

|-
|  | Thomas Posey (DR)
| Appointee lost election to finish the term.Successor elected February 4, 1813.
|  | James Brown (DR)
| February 5, 1813

|}

House of Representatives 
 Replacements: 3
 Democratic-Republicans: no net change
 Federalists: no net change
 Deaths: 2
 Resignations: 5
 Contested election: 1
 Seats of newly admitted states: 1
 Vacancies: 1
Total seats with changes: 10

|-
| 
|  | John Montgomery (DR)
| Resigned April 29, 1811, to become attorney General of Maryland
|  | Stevenson Archer (DR)
| Seated October 26, 1811
|-
| 
|  | Joseph B. Varnum (DR)
| Resigned June 29, 1811, to become U.S. Senator
|  | William M. Richardson (DR)
| Seated November 4, 1811
|-
| 
|  | John Hungerford (DR)
| Lost contested election November 29, 1811
|  | John Taliaferro (DR)
| Seated November 29, 1811
|-
| 
|  | Barzillai Gannett (DR)
| Resigned sometime in 1812 before April 6
|  | Francis Carr (DR)
| Seated April 6, 1812
|-
| 
|  | Thomas Blount (DR)
| Died February 7, 1812
|  | William Kennedy (DR)
| Seated January 30, 1813
|-
| 
| colspan=2 rowspan=2 | Julien de Lallande Poydras had resigned in the previous Congress, and the seat remained vacant until the territory became the state of Louisiana on April 30, 1812
| rowspan=2  | Thomas B. Robertson (DR)
| rowspan=2 | Seated April 30, 1812
|-
| 

|-
| 
|  | Robert Le Roy Livingston (F)
| Resigned May 6, 1812
|  | Thomas P. Grosvenor (F)
| Seated January 29, 1813
|-
| 
|  | Howell Cobb (DR)
| Resigned sometime before October 1812
|  | William Barnett (DR)
| Seated October 5, 1812
|-
| 
| colspan=2 | Territory delegate seat established
| Edward Hempstead
| Seated November 9, 1812
|-
| 
| colspan=2 | Territory delegate seat established
| Shadrach Bond
| Seated December 3, 1812
|-
| 
|  | John Smilie (DR)
| Died December 30, 1812
| Vacant
| Not filled until next Congress
|}

Committees
Lists of committees and their party leaders.

Senate

 Audit and Control the Contingent Expenses of the Senate (Chairman: Michael Leib)
 Engrossed Bills (Chairman: Nicholas Gilman)
 National University 
 Whole

House of Representatives

 Accounts (Chairman: Charles Turner Jr.)
 Apportionment of Representatives (Select) 
 Bankruptcy (Select) 
 Claims (Chairman: Burwell Bassett then Thomas Gholson Jr.)
 Commerce and Manufactures (Chairman: Thomas Newton Jr.)
 District of Columbia (Chairman: Joseph Lewis Jr.)
 Elections (Chairman: William Findley)
 Post Office and Post Roads (Chairman: John Rhea)
 Public Lands (Chairman: Jeremiah Morrow)
 Revisal and Unfinished Business (Chairman: Adam Seybert then Burwell Bassett)
 Rules (Select) 
 Standards of Official Conduct 
 Ways and Means (Chairman: Ezekiel Bacon then Langdon Cheves)
 Whole

Joint committees

 Enrolled Bills
 The Library (Chairman: N/A)

Employees

Legislative branch agency directors 
Architect of the Capitol: Benjamin Latrobe, until July 1, 1811; vacant thereafter
Librarian of Congress: Patrick Magruder

Senate 
Chaplain: Walter D. Addison (Presbyterian), until November 13, 1811
 John Brackenridge (Presbyterian), from November 13, 1811
Secretary: Samuel A. Otis
Sergeant at Arms: James Mathers, died
 Mountjoy Bayly, elected November 6, 1811

House of Representatives 
Chaplain: Jesse Lee (Methodist), until November 13, 1811
 Nicholas Snethen (Methodist), elected November 13, 1811
 Jesse Lee (Methodist), elected November 2, 1812
Clerk: Patrick Magruder
Doorkeeper: Thomas Claxton
Reading Clerks: 
Sergeant at Arms: Thomas Dunn

See also 
 1810 United States elections (elections leading to this Congress)
 1810–11 United States Senate elections
 1810–11 United States House of Representatives elections
 United States elections, 1812 (elections during this Congress, leading to the next Congress)
 1812 United States presidential election
 1812–13 United States Senate elections
 1812–13 United States House of Representatives elections

Notes

References

External links
Statutes at Large, 1789-1875 
Senate Journal, First Forty-three Sessions of Congress
House Journal, First Forty-three Sessions of Congress
Biographical Directory of the U.S. Congress 
U.S. House of Representatives: House History 
U.S. Senate: Statistics and Lists